Ashley Sippala (born Ashley Miharija, January 21, 1987) is a Canadian curler. Sippala currently plays second for the Krista McCarville rink.

Career
Sippala's first major curling event was when she played third for Mike Assad's Northern Ontario team at the 2008 Canadian Mixed Curling Championship. The team finished 6–5.

Sippala skipped Team Northern Ontario at the 2008 Canadian Junior Curling Championships. Her rink of Jessica Williams, Jenna Enge and Sarah Lang finished with an 8–4 record, before losing in a tie-breaker match to Saskatchewan.

The following season, Sippala qualified for her first women's provincial championship. She skipped her Port Arthur Curling Club rink to a 4–5 record at the 2009 Ontario Scotties Tournament of Hearts. She was invited by Krista McCarville to be the team's alternate at the 2009 Scotties Tournament of Hearts.

The following season, she fully joined the McCarville rink, first playing as the team's second. The team won the 2010 Ontario Scotties Tournament of Hearts, and the team went on to win a bronze medal at the 2010 Scotties Tournament of Hearts, losing the semi-final to Prince Edward Island.

The next season, Sippala was promoted to the team's third. She was moved to second in 2015 when Kendra Lilly was added to the team. The team won a silver medal at the 2016 Scotties Tournament of Hearts. They also played in the 2017 Canadian Olympic Curling Trials, finishing 4–4.

Team McCarville won the 2020 Northern Ontario Scotties Tournament of Hearts which qualified them for the 2020 Scotties Tournament of Hearts in Moose Jaw, Saskatchewan. They lost the 3 vs. 4 game to Ontario's Rachel Homan.

The 2021 Northern Ontario provincial playdowns were cancelled due to the COVID-19 pandemic in Ontario. As the 2020 provincial champions, Sippala, with McCarville's team, was given an automatic invitation to represent Northern Ontario at the 2021 Scotties Tournament of Hearts in Calgary. However, the team declined the invitation, citing family and work priorities.

Team McCarville had enough points to qualify for the 2021 Canadian Olympic Curling Pre-Trials. There, they went 5–1 through the round robin, qualifying for the playoffs. The team had two impressive come-from-behind wins in their two playoff games. In their first game against the Mackenzie Zacharias rink, they were down 7–3 heading into the tenth end, but scored four points, then stole a point in the extra end to win the match. In their second game against Jacqueline Harrison, the team gave up five points in the second end to trail 5–1, but rallied back to win the game 9–6. With the win, they qualified for the 2021 Canadian Olympic Curling Trials, held November 20 to 28 in Saskatoon, Saskatchewan. At the Trials, the team went through the round robin with a 4–4 record. This earned them a spot in the second tiebreaker where they defeated Kerri Einarson 4–3. In the semifinal, they lost 8–3 to Jennifer Jones, eliminating them from contention. The 2022 Northern Ontario Scotties Tournament of Hearts was cancelled due to the pandemic and Team McCarville were selected to represent their province at the national women's championship. At the 2022 Scotties Tournament of Hearts, the team went 5–3 through the round robin, enough to qualify for the playoffs. The team then won both of their seeding round games and defeated New Brunswick's Andrea Crawford in the 1 vs. 2 page playoff game to qualify for the final where they faced the Einarson rink. There, they could not keep their momentum going, losing the Scotties final 9–6. They wrapped up their season at the 2022 Players' Championship where they missed the playoffs.

Personal life
Sippala is employed as a lab technician for the Thunder Bay Regional Health Sciences Centre. She is married to Brian Sippala and has two children.

References

External links

 CCA profile

1987 births
Canadian women curlers
Curlers from Northern Ontario
Living people
Curlers from Thunder Bay
Canada Cup (curling) participants